Minnesota Lake or Lake Minnesota may refer to a location in the United States:

Cities, towns, townships etc.
Minnesota Lake, Minnesota, a town in Faribault County
Minnesota Lake Township, Faribault County, Minnesota

Lakes
Minnesota Lake (Faribault County, Minnesota)
Glacial Lake Minnesota